Aquatic Microbial Ecology is a monthly peer-reviewed scientific journal covering all aspects of aquatic microbial dynamics, in particular viruses, prokaryotes, and eukaryotes in marine, limnetic, and brackish habitats. The journal was originally established as Marine Microbial Food Webs by P. Bougis and F. Rassoulzadegan in 1985, and acquired its current name in 1995. The journal is currently published by Inter Research.

Abstracting and indexing
The journal is indexed and abstracted in:

References

External links 

Microbiology journals
Ecology journals
Publications established in 1985
English-language journals
Monthly journals